Peth Rungsri is a Paralympian athlete from Thailand competing mainly in category T52 sprint events.

He competed in the 2004 Summer Paralympics in Athens, Greece.  There he finished eighth in the men's 100 metres - T52 event, finished fifth in the men's 200 metres - T52 event, finished seventh in the men's 400 metres - T52 event and finished eighth in the men's 800 metres - T52 event.  He also competed at the 2008 Summer Paralympics in Beijing, China.    There he won a bronze medal in the men's 200 metres - T52 event, finished sixth in the men's 100 metres - T52 event, finished fifth in the men's 400 metres - T52 event and finished eighth in the men's 800 metres - T52 event. He won the 100m T52 at the 2014 Asian Para Games.

References

External links
 

Peth Rungsri
Athletes (track and field) at the 2004 Summer Paralympics
Athletes (track and field) at the 2008 Summer Paralympics
Peth Rungsri
Living people
Year of birth missing (living people)
Medalists at the 2004 Summer Paralympics
Paralympic medalists in athletics (track and field)
Athletes (track and field) at the 2020 Summer Paralympics
Peth Rungsri
Medalists at the 2014 Asian Para Games
Medalists at the 2018 Asian Para Games